Sam Watson (born 28 December 1985) is an Irish eventing rider. Representing Ireland, he has competed at three editions of World Equestrian Games (in 2010, 2014 and 2018). His best achievements came at the 2018 edition of the Games, held in Tryon, North Carolina, where he won a silver medal with an Irish team and placed 14th individually.

Watson has also competed at numerous European Chamopionships. His best result at the European stage is 4th place in team eventing in 2011. Meanwhile, his best individual result is 12th place from 2015.

His father John Watson is a multiple World and European Championships medalist in eventing, as well as Seoul 1988 Olympian.

References

External links
 
 
 
 

1985 births
Living people
Irish male equestrians
Olympic equestrians of Ireland
Equestrians at the 2020 Summer Olympics
20th-century Irish people
21st-century Irish people